The following lists events that happened during 1932 in South Africa.

Incumbents
 Monarch: King George V.
 Governor-General and High Commissioner for Southern Africa: The Earl of Clarendon.
 Prime Minister: James Barry Munnik Hertzog.
 Chief Justice: Jacob de Villiers then John Wessels.

Events
September
 21 – A new embellished version of the coat of arms of South Africa is approved.

Births
 18 January – Peter Magubane, photographer
 4 March – Miriam Makeba, South African singer. (d. 2008)
 13 April – Barney Simon, writer, playwright and director (d. 1995)
 25 April – Frene Ginwala, Speaker of the National Assembly of South Africa
 27 April – Pik Botha, politician. (d. 2018)
 11 June – Athol Fugard, author and dramatist.
 12 June – Patrick Mynhardt, actor.
 12 June – Mimi Coertse, opera soprano.
 18 June – Louis Luyt, business tycoon and politician, and one-time rugby administrator (d. 2013)
 26 June – Harry Bromfield, cricketer.
 12 July – Sheena Duncan, member of the Anglican Church's Challenge Group and Black Sash movement. (d. 2010)
 29 November – Johann Kriegler, Constitutional Court of South Africa.

Deaths
 19 June – Sol Plaatje, intellectual, journalist, linguist, politician, translator and writer. (b. 1876)
 15 July – Cornelis Jacobus Langenhoven, playwright, poet, journalist and politician. (b. 1873)
 30 December – Daisy de Melker is hanged for the murder of her 20-year-old son Rhodes Cowle. (b. 1886)

Railways

Sports

References

History of South Africa